, also called Miracle Ropit's Adventure in 2100 on its title screen, is a Family Computer video game that was released in 1987 exclusively for the Japanese market. The Adventures of Star Saver, also known as Rubble Saver is a related quasi-sequel for Game Boy.

Summary

The game must be played through twice in order to see the true ending, just like in Ghosts 'n Goblins.

A girl in the year 2100 uses a robot suit. If the player is hit once, then the suit is lost and the player must play as the little girl. One more hit and the player loses a life. Although the game was only released in Japan, the game's text is in English and is completely playable by English speakers.

Notes

References

1987 video games
Action video games
Japan-exclusive video games
Micronics games
Nintendo Entertainment System games
Nintendo Entertainment System-only games
Science fiction video games
Video games developed in Japan
Video games featuring female protagonists
Multiplayer and single-player video games